Lee Edwin Stripling (August 30, 1921 – April 20, 2009) was a singer and fiddler in the old-time style.

Stripling was born in Kennedy, Alabama to Charlie and Tellie Stripling. His father, Charlie Stripling (1896–1966), was a well-known fiddler of his day. Lee played in the 1920s and 1930s in the American Southeast; in the early 1940s, he switched to Western Swing.

Stripling served in the Army Air Corps during World War II. After the war, he stopped playing professionally and moved to Seattle, Washington, where he worked as a bookbinder for the University of Washington. Following a hiatus of more than fifty years, he resumed his musical career, playing throughout the Pacific Northwest at Northwest Folklife Festival, MerleFest, The Berkeley Old Time Music Convention and touring several times through his old home region of Northwestern Alabama. He played with the Lee Stripling Trio and with the Six Footed Boys. He died on April 20, 2009, at the age of 87. He was married to Lucille (died 1998) with whom he had two daughters.

A documentary featuring him, Winging My Way Back Home: The Stripling Fiddle Legacy, was filmed over a three-year period by Jeri Vaughn.

Recordings
 Hogs Picking Up Acorns Voyager, VRCD349, 2000
 The Lee Stripling Trio

References

External links
 Lee Stripling website
 YouTube performances  
 drawing of Lee Stripling
 Roses in Winter bio
 Trailer for Winging My Way Back Home

American fiddlers
Musicians from Seattle
People from Lamar County, Alabama
1921 births
2009 deaths
United States Army Air Forces soldiers
United States Army personnel of World War II
20th-century American violinists